The Communauté de communes Isigny-Omaha Intercom is a communauté de communes, an intercommunal structure, in the Calvados department, in the Normandy region, northwestern France. It was created in January 2017 by the merger of the former communautés de communes Intercom Balleroy Le Molay-Littry, Isigny Grandcamp Intercom and  Trévières. Its area is 581.7 km2, and its population was 26,543 in 2019. Its seat is in Le Molay-Littry.

Communes
The communauté de communes consists of the following 59 communes:

Asnières-en-Bessin
Aure sur Mer
Balleroy-sur-Drôme
La Bazoque
Bernesq
Blay
Le Breuil-en-Bessin
Bricqueville
Cahagnolles
La Cambe
Canchy
Cardonville
Cartigny-l'Épinay
Castillon
Colleville-sur-Mer
Colombières
Cormolain
Cricqueville-en-Bessin
Crouay
Deux-Jumeaux
Englesqueville-la-Percée
Étréham
La Folie
Formigny La Bataille
Foulognes
Géfosse-Fontenay
Grandcamp-Maisy
Isigny-sur-Mer
Lison
Litteau
Longueville
Maisons
Mandeville-en-Bessin
Le Molay-Littry
Monfréville
Montfiquet
Mosles
Noron-la-Poterie
Osmanville
Planquery
Rubercy
Sainte-Honorine-de-Ducy
Sainte-Marguerite-d'Elle
Saint-Germain-du-Pert
Saint-Laurent-sur-Mer
Saint-Marcouf
Saint-Martin-de-Blagny
Saint-Paul-du-Vernay
Saint-Pierre-du-Mont
Sallen
Saon
Saonnet
Surrain
Tour-en-Bessin
Tournières
Trévières
Le Tronquay
Trungy
Vierville-sur-Mer

References

Isigny-Omaha Intercom
Isigny-Omaha Intercom